The ELS Bridge over Big Wind River is a pony truss bridge located near Dubois, Wyoming, which carries Fremont County Road CN10-21 across the Big Wind River. The bridge was built circa 1920. Its design is uncommon and merges a kingpost truss with an arched chord. The materials used to build the bridge are also unusual and were likely salvaged; for instance, the arches are made from tunnel sets.

The bridge was added to the National Register of Historic Places on February 22, 1985. It was one of several bridges added to the National Register for their role in the history of Wyoming bridge construction. The bridge was replaced by 2006.

See also
List of bridges documented by the Historic American Engineering Record in Wyoming

References

External links

Road bridges on the National Register of Historic Places in Wyoming
Buildings and structures in Fremont County, Wyoming
King post truss bridges in the United States
Historic American Engineering Record in Wyoming
National Register of Historic Places in Fremont County, Wyoming
Demolished but still listed on the National Register of Historic Places